, often shortened to , is a Japanese light novel series written by  with illustrations by Reine Hibiki. Originally written as a short story in 1997, Shueisha published 37 light novel volumes from April 1998 to April 2012. The story focuses on a group of teenage girls attending the Catholic Lillian Girls' Academy in Tokyo, Japan. Its storyline largely revolves around the lives and close relationships of the school's student council known as the Yamayuri Council.

A manga adaptation was published by Shueisha in Margaret and its sister magazine The Margaret. Between 2004 and 2009, the series was adapted by Studio Deen into three 13-episode anime television series and a five-episode original video animation (OVA) series. The anime adaptations have been released in North America by Nozomi Entertainment under the title Maria Watches Over Us. The license was later transferred to Maiden Japan. A live-action film adaptation was released in Japan in November 2010. Several audio dramas and music albums were also published.

Maria-sama ga Miteru received generally positive reviews by critics. It has been described as representative of yuri novels, and has been credited with starting "the modern yuri trend," in addition to reviving the Class S genre. Critics have praised the series for its strong characterization, even among peripheral characters, and for its emphasis on romance and emotion over sexuality. The dramatization, however, has been criticized as being overly dramatic at times, but the lack of malicious characters has been described as reducing the chance for more drama. The extensive use of French titles has also been criticized as being distracting and initially difficult to follow. Over 5.4 million copies of the light novels have been published.

Plot

Setting and themes
Among the facilities of Lillian, aside from the classrooms, there is a church, a greenhouse, a kendo dojo, an auditorium, a park, and the Rose Mansion, where the Yamayuri Council meet. The students are very respectable and in good standing. The uniform at the school is a long, black Japanese school uniform with a white collar.

The school uses the fictional sœur system where any second- or third-year student, the grande sœur ("big sister"), might pick a younger girl who will become her "sœur" (sister in French). The grande sœur gives her the petite sœur ("little sister") a rosary and promises to look after her and guide her. The basic etiquette demands the petite sœur to call her grande sœur "onee-sama" (older sister in Japanese). Aside from being used in prayer, the rosary is the instrument that certifies the sœur union and relationship between two students. There is an implicit code of behavior between sœurs, especially in the Yamayuri Council—the student council of the school: quietness, measure and respect towards each other; values deeply attached to traditional Japanese education.

French is occasionally used throughout the story; for example, the series is given the French subtitle La Vierge Marie vous regarde, which means "The Virgin Mary is watching you". In keeping with the tone of the series, formal language is used:  is a strictly formal and respectful greeting in Japanese, and is used both to greet and to bid farewell. By custom, this greeting is used often in the Lillian School; this has been one of the distinguishable and popular phrases of the series, and it is used to begin or to finish each volume. The Animax English-language version translates the word as "good day to you".

The Lillian Girls' Academy uses the lily symbolism as the white lily is the flower of the Virgin Mary. The white lily is a Christian symbol of virginity and purity. This lily imagery is also used as a reference to yuri: the story has some elements of romance between female characters; the use of lilies reinforces this in subtext, as do the names of the student council and of the school itself. The series is only explicit about a romantic relationship once in a flashback, but many of the sisters have romantic friendships.

The musical choices of the Maria-sama ga Miteru anime adaptations are generally classical music-inspired. The Christian hymn  is often referred to in the series. In the context of the series, it is a children's song taught to the students at Lillian.

Story and characters

Maria-sama ga Miteru'''s story revolves around the students of the Lillian Girls' Academy and is character-driven, focusing on interactions between the characters rather than any sort of ongoing plot or goal to attain. When the story begins, Yumi Fukuzawa, a first-year student at Lillian, is praying in front of the Virgin Mary statue near the school entrance when she is suddenly approached by a cold second-year student named Sachiko Ogasawara who straightens Yumi's uniform neckerchief. This seemingly simple act of kindness stays with Yumi the rest of the day, and she speaks of her meeting with Sachiko to her friends during class and lunch.

After school is over, Yumi's classmate Tsutako Takeshima meets with Yumi to show her that she took a photograph of Yumi's meeting with Sachiko earlier that morning. Yumi asks if she can have the photo, but Tsutako says she will give her the snapshot under two conditions: one being that Tsutako can display it at the upcoming school festival, and two being that Yumi get Sachiko's permission to do so as well. Yumi agrees to this, which sets in motion a series of events involving the entire Yamayuri Council. A few weeks after first meeting Sachiko, Yumi accepts Sachiko's rosary and therefore agrees to become her petite sœur. This officially inducts Yumi into the Yamayuri Council where she assists them in school matters alongside Yoshino Shimazu and Shimako Tōdō—the petite sœurs of Rei Hasekura and Sei Satō, respectively. Through her activities in the Yamayuri Council, Yumi becomes closer to the other members and generally finds her experiences with the group to be enjoyable.

Yamayuri Council

Located within the school, it consists of two stories, including a meeting room on the second story.

Due to the high importance the three Rose families have in the development of the student activities within school, those who become petites sœurs of any of the mentioned families receive a functional "inheritance" through the grandes sœurs teachings, to adopt a position given certain circumstances. In this way, there are patrons recognized through the generations of the members of the Rose families. Still, after graduating, the grandes sœurs of the Yamayuri Council may continue with a fair participation in the events concerning their families, as shown in the novels.

A Rose makes the important decisions within this group, since she has control over the student council. Candidates for the position, which lasts through the school year, are chosen through an election. Any student can run to become a Rose, although the position is usually given to the en boutons, the Roses' petite sœurs.

En bouton is French for "in bud"—as used in the example Rosa Chinensis en bouton—and is unofficially considered part of the Yamayuri Council, as is the petite sœur of the en bouton, if she has one. The en boutons must be in a lower year than their Rosa, and generally the en boutons execute the plans discussed by the Roses, like assistants. Although the Rosa positions of the Yamayuri Council are traditionally passed to the en bouton on the graduation of the current holder, they are nonetheless elected offices which anyone may run for.

She must be in a lower year than her en bouton and performs small duties; such as attending to the Roses' en boutons, cleaning the Rose Mansion, and making tea and snacks for the Yamayuri Council. This lasts a school year; and the following year when their en bouton is elected as Rosas, the petite sœurs become en boutons automatically.

Production
After writing her debut novel series  for three years starting in March 1994, Oyuki Konno published a short story called "Maria-sama ga Miteru" in the February 1997 issue of the shōjo magazine Cobalt with illustrations by Yuma Aoi. In 1993, Konno had previously won both Cobalt's Novel Award and Readers' Award for Yume no Miya, and by February 1997, nine volumes had been released.

In the afterword of the first Maria-sama ga Miteru light novel volume, Konno admitted that Maria-sama ga Miteru was very different from her usual genre of story-telling in Yume no Miya, which she described as an "imperial story" set in a fictionalized classical Japan. For the basis of Lillian Girls' Academy, Konno drew from her own experiences attending an all-girl high school, and some of the scenery of Lillian was also taken from this, such as a ginkgo pathway which stretched out from the main gate. The laid-back atmosphere of the school was also incorporated into Lillian, although Konno's school did not have a sœur system and it was not a Catholic school. Konno had been exposed to Christianity from a young age: she attended a completely Christian kindergarten which had a sanctuary and cloister in the middle of the school. Konno notes that she put her own questions about the Virgin Mary's heart into the story via Yumi. Konno ultimately mixed together various sources and ended up with Lillian Girls' Academy.

Media
Light novels

After writing the Maria-sama ga Miteru short story, Konno expanded it into a series of novels. The first volume was published on April 24, 1998, with illustrations by Reine Hibiki. In terms of the storyline, this first novel marks the beginning of the series; the original 1997 short story was reworked and republished in the ninth volume Cherry Blossom in 2001. Shueisha published 37 light novels in the series, ending with Farewell Bouquet on April 28, 2012. There were also two additional volumes published, the first containing an overview of the series and interviews, and the second featuring an illustration collection. Second editions were published starting in 2018 to commemorate its 20th anniversary. In February 2003, with 12 volumes released, Konno began to publish more short stories in Cobalt, with illustrations by Hibiki. Counting the 1997 debut, 27 short stories were published, which were included in later novels. The first five volumes of the light novel series were translated into German by Tokyopop.

Konno also wrote a spin-off series of light novels titled , also illustrated by Hibiki. These focus on Yumi's younger brother Yūki and his schoolmates at Hanadera. Shueisha published 10 volumes between August 1, 2008 and November 30, 2013.

Manga

A manga adaptation, drawn by Satoru Nagasawa, was serialized in Shueisha's shōjo manga magazine Margaret between October 2003 and October 2005. Following this, the manga was transferred to Shueisha's sister magazine The Margaret between May 2006 and December 2007. The manga was again serialized in The Margaret between May and August 2010. The individual chapters were collected and published in nine tankōbon volumes released by Shueisha between February 2004 and October 2010. The first eight volumes were republished in five omnibus volumes in Japan between April and July 2010. The story in each volume follows the corresponding volume of the novels. The first eight volumes were translated into German by Tokyopop.

Six brief manga one-shots, illustrated by Reine Hibiki and based on some scenes from the novels, were published by Shueisha in Cobalt between February 2003 and December 2004. "Before the Festival" was later included in volume 18 of the novels, Premium Book, and the other five were later published in volume 26 of the novels, Illustration Collection. A one-shot of Oshaka-sama mo Miteru, illustrated by Sakura Kenjō, was published in Shueisha's Comic Cobalt magazine in August 2010.

Anime

A 13-episode anime television series adaptation of Maria-sama ga Miteru aired in Japan between January 7 and March 31, 2004 on TV Tokyo. Produced by Studio Deen and directed by Yukihiro Matsushita, the screenplay was written by Reiko Yoshida, and Akira Matsushima based the character design used in the anime on Reine Hibiki's original designs. The art director for the series is Nobuto Sakamoto. The sound director is Yoshikazu Iwanami, and the soundtrack is composed by Mikiya Katakura. The series was later released by Geneon to seven VHS and DVD compilation volumes from April to October 2004.

Most of the production staff would return to produce two additional television series and an original video animation (OVA) series. The 13-episode second season, titled , aired between July 4 and September 26, 2004 on TV Tokyo. The series was later released by Geneon to six VHS and DVD compilation volumes from October 2004 to April 2005. The third season, a five-episode OVA series titled Maria-sama ga Miteru, was released on DVD from November 29, 2006 to July 25, 2007; each episode is approximately 50 minutes long. The 13-episode fourth season, again titled Maria-sama ga Miteru, aired between January 3 and March 28, 2009 on AT-X. The series was released by Geneon to six DVD compilation volumes from March to August 2009. Instead of Yukihiro Matsushita who had directed the first three seasons, the fourth season is directed by Toshiyuki Katō.

In addition to the main anime series, a parody series called  is included as a bonus on the DVD releases of the three televisions seasons and the OVA series. There are 29 episodes: seven from season one, six for season two, five for season three, and eleven for season four. The episodes consist of short segments of fake outtakes and parody skits drawn in a super deformed style and starring the cast of the anime.

Nozomi Entertainment, the licensing branch of Right Stuf Inc., had licensed the three television series and the OVA series under the title Maria Watches Over Us for North American distribution. The four series were released as DVD box sets with English subtitles as follows: July 29, 2008 for season one, November 25, 2008 for season two, March 24, 2009 for season three, and July 6, 2010 for season four. Maiden Japan licensed the three television series and the OVA series after Nozomi Entertainment's license to the franchise had expired. An English dub for the series was considered in 2018.

Audio CDs
For the first Maria-sama ga Miteru anime series, the opening theme "Pastel Pure" and the ending theme is "Sonata Blue". Both songs are instrumental tracks composed by Mikiya Katakura of the band Ali Project and were released on a theme song album in February 2004. The original soundtrack for the first anime series was released in February 2004. For Maria-sama ga Miteru: Printemps, the opening theme is a vocal version of "Pastel Pure" by Ali Project and the ending theme is again "Sonata Blue". The single for "Pastel Pure" was released in August 2004. The original soundtrack for Printemps was released in September 2004.

For the Maria-sama ga Miteru OVA series, the opening theme is again the instrumental version of "Pastel Pure", and there are two ending themes. The single for the first ending theme  by Kotoko was released in October 2006, and the single for the second ending theme  by Kotoko was released in March 2007. The original soundtrack for the OVA series was released in March 2007. For the Maria-sama ga Miteru fourth season, the single for the opening theme  by Kukui was released in February 2009, and the single for the ending theme  by Kaori Hikita was also released in February 2009. For the Maria-sama ga Miteru live-action film, the theme song "Heavenly Days" by CooRie was released on her album Heavenly Days in October 2010.

Three volumes of albums titled Maria-sama ga Miteru: Haru Image Album containing image songs and background music tracks were released between April and September 2005. Each image album was assigned to one of the three families of roses; the songs were sung by the voice actors of the anime series. A vocal album titled Christmas Album was released in December 2008. Shueisha produced 12 drama CDs between January 14, 2004 and December 14, 2007, and Frontier Works produced three additional drama CDs between July 24, 2009 and July 22, 2010; the CDs use the same voice actors from the anime series. The drama CDs are based on the stories in the novels. The fifth and tenth drama CDs by Shueisha were released in limited edition versions each with a slipcase and a pair of character mini-figures.

Internet radio show
An Internet radio show to promote Maria-sama ga Miteru called  was hosted by Kana Ueda, the voice of Yumi Fukuzawa, and featured other voice actors from the anime series as guests. The show features conversations and publicity, often commenting with news of the anime series and other funny situations from the plot of the novels. It had a pre-broadcast special for Christmas on December 22, 2005, and later broadcast 19 episodes between March 9 and November 24, 2006. The show was streamed online every other Thursday, and was produced by Animate TV. Three additional broadcasts followed: a New Year's Day special on January 25, 2007, a Hinamatsuri special on March 1, 2007, and another Christmas special on December 20, 2007.

The radio show returned to broadcast 13 main episodes and 3 specials between August 27, 2008 and September 30, 2009. Again hosted by Ueda, the show was streamed online every last Wednesday of the month, and was also produced by Animate TV. Combined, the two radio show seasons were later released on 13 CD compilation volumes by Frontier Works between August 4, 2006 and February 24, 2010.

Live-action film

A live-action film adaptation premiered in Japanese theaters on November 6, 2010. The film is directed by Kōtarō Terauchi, and Terauchi co-wrote the script with Keiji Sagami. The film's music is composed by Chika Fujino. The film was released on Blu-ray Disc and DVD in Japan on July 29, 2011. To tie in with the film, a new edition of the first light novel was published in June 2010 with a cover featuring stars Honoka Miki and Haru.

Reception
It was reported in April 2010 that 5.4 million copies of the original light novels have been published. Reception to the Maria-sama ga Miteru anime series has been generally positive, although Anime News Network (ANN) noted that the series leaves itself "wide open to cynical sniggering." Carlos Ross from Them Anime regarded it as "one of the most beautiful and graceful anime" series, adding that the animation is sometimes of questionable quality but overall "very appealing". Andrew Shelton from AMR found the series to be "fairly unique" compared to other shōjo works, explaining that although the story is "a little basic" and "overly dramatic", what is most important is the "response and actions of the character on who the story is focused." Stig Høgset, also from Them Anime, commented that the third season was criticized for being too short, but he personally did not feel "like it was lacking something." Jason Thompson credits Maria-sama ga Miteru with starting "the modern yuri trend." Newer anime titles that Maria-sama ga Miteru is compared to include Otome wa Boku ni Koishiteru, Strawberry Panic!, Best Student Council, and Aria. Carlos Ross, writing about the first novel in the series, felt the story was a "classic rags-to-riches tale," but that it was "also sweet, touching and witty when it needs to be." He criticized the lack of teachers and schoolwork in the series, which led to the plot being filled with extracurricular activities, which are common to high school series. He also criticized Yumi's low self-esteem.

A characteristic element of the series is the extensive use of French titles, which Carlos Ross has criticized as "distracting". Mania.com criticized the early anime episodes as being "difficult", and saying that the first episode "throws a lot of terms and names at you". On the other hand, Ross compared the "atmosphere" presented by the series' artwork with those from other anime titles of similar setting, including the bright and vivid Revolutionary Girl Utena. Another reviewer from Them Anime also compared Maria-sama ga Miteru with Oniisama e..., but noted that the former is much less dramatic. Marc Hairston commented on the unusual character designs compared to other series, and said they are "ordinary students." ANN also noted the "clear, expressive eyes and character designs that are gifted with an understated mobility," praising the casting choices, and noting that even "peripheral" characters are "fully realized." Holly Ellingwood of Active Anime described the relationships between the characters as "intensely platonic" and "pseudo-gay" for the most part.

ANN noted that the second anime season tends to overdramatize, especially in the last three episodes. ANN also describes the second season as "more embarrassing and shoujo-ai oriented" than the first season, but that the solid characterization is still a strength of the series. Holly Ellingwood of Active Anime appreciated the focus on characters other than Yumi and Sachiko for the second season, regarding Shimako's loss of Sei and befriending Noriko as being "one of the more moving" arcs of Printemps. ANN regarded the OVA season as the best of the first three seasons, citing the improved production standards and the less melodramatic storylines. ANN notes that the fourth season is "a return to dramatic form" after the relaxation of the OVA series, but it is not as melodramatic as the second season, due to the increased maturity of the cast. Chris Beveridge, writing for Mania.com, found it odd that Yumi and Sachiko did not spend so much time together in the fourth season, and felt that the series needed an epilogue, but enjoyed seeing Yumi taking on some "adult responsibilities."

Andrew Shelton has suggested that Maria-sama ga Miteru's "reduced capacity for epic drama" is due to the lack of malicious characters; he considers the series "pure shōjo", mostly due to its character-driven storyline. Japanese reviewers for their part regard the story as a revival of the Class S genre, and specifically a modern-day equivalent of Nobuko Yoshiya's Hana Monogatari. Hairston notes that Maria-sama ga Miteru emphasizes romance and emotion over sexuality, and it has a respectful treatment of its homoerotic themes. He describes the series as "one of the most interesting and touching anime series of the last two years", adding that it is "about self-discovery and self-acceptance."

A Pizza Hut tie-in campaign for the fourth anime series started on January 7, 2008. The Rose Mansion from the story was recreated in the Second Life'' virtual world and opened on February 8, 2008.

References

External links

Maria-sama ga Miteru first anime series at TV Tokyo 
Maria-sama ga Miteru second anime series at TV Tokyo 
Maria Watches Over Us at Nozomi Entertainment

 
1990s LGBT novels
1998 Japanese novels
2003 manga
2004 anime television series debuts
2004 Japanese television series endings
2006 anime OVAs
2008 Japanese novels
2009 anime television series debuts
2009 Japanese television series endings
Anime and manga based on light novels
Cobalt Bunko
Japanese LGBT-related animated television series
Light novels
Maiden Japan
NBCUniversal Entertainment Japan
Novels set in Tokyo
Romance anime and manga
School life in anime and manga
Shōjo manga
Shueisha books
Shueisha manga
Studio Deen
Television shows based on light novels
TV Tokyo original programming
Yuri (genre) anime and manga
Yuri (genre) light novels